Łężce  is a village in the administrative district of Gmina Reńska Wieś, within Kędzierzyn-Koźle County, Opole Voivodeship, in southern Poland.

History
In the 10th century the area became part of the emerging Polish state, and later on, it was part of Poland, Bohemia (Czechia), Prussia, and Germany. During World War II, the Germans operated the E346 forced labour subcamp of the Stalag VIII-B/344 prisoner-of-war camp at a local farm. After Germany's defeat in the war, in 1945, the village became again part of Poland.

References

Villages in Kędzierzyn-Koźle County